Katelan Lea Redmon (born October 11, 1988) is an American professional basketball player, most recently for the New York Liberty of the Women's National Basketball Association.

Washington and Gonzaga statistics

Source

USA Basketball

Redmon was selected to represent the USA at the 2011 Pan American Games held in Guadalajara, Mexico. The USA team lost their first two games in close contests, losing to Argentina 58–55 and Puerto Rico 75–70. The team rebounded to win their games against Mexico and Jamaica, but the 2–2 overall record left them in seventh place. Redmon averaged 6.5 points per game.

References
WNBA profile

1988 births
Living people
American women's basketball players
Basketball players at the 2011 Pan American Games
Basketball players from Spokane, Washington
Gonzaga Bulldogs women's basketball players
New York Liberty draft picks
New York Liberty players
Pan American Games competitors for the United States
Shooting guards
Small forwards
Washington Huskies women's basketball players